The Kazakhstan men's national under-18 ice hockey team is the men's national under-18 ice hockey team of Kazakhstan. The team is controlled by the Kazakhstan Ice Hockey Federation, a member of the International Ice Hockey Federation. The team represents Kazakhstan at the IIHF World U18 Championships. At the IIHF Asian Oceanic U18 Championships, the team won three gold and two silver medals in five appearances.

International competitions

IIHF Asian Oceanic U18 Championships

1993:  1st place
1994:  1st place
1995:  2nd place
1996:  1st place
1997:  2nd place

IIHF World U18 Championships

External links
Kazakhstan at IIHF.com

Under
National under-18 ice hockey teams